Babur (Urdu: بابر; named after the first Mughal Emperor Zahir-ud-Din Babur), military designated: Hatf-VII, Translit: Target–7, is a Pakistani medium range turbojet powered subsonic cruise missile that can be launched from land or underwater seaborne platforms. The missile was first tested in 2005 and is widely believed to have entered service with the Pakistan Army in 2010, and the Pakistan Navy in 2018.

Development history

Pakistan claims to have developed the Babur in response to alleged reports that India was planning to acquire Patriot missiles from the US, in order to set up a ballistic missile defense system to counter Pakistan's arsenal of ballistic missiles. Babur is the first cruise missile to be developed and designed by Pakistan.

Origins
Babur has been at the center of speculation regarding its origins and development. While, some analysts have pointed out similarities of the missile with Chinese and American designs, namely the DH-10 and Tomahawk.

In 2020, former Prime Minister Nawaz Sharif claimed that Pakistani scientists had reverse-engineered the American Tomahawk missile to make the Babur missile, when one fell in Pakistan's territory during the American cruise missile attack in Afghanistan.

Design
The Babur's airframe is made up of a tubular fuselage, with a pair of folded wings attached to the middle section and the empennage at the rear along with the propulsion system. Propelled by a jet engine (turbojet), the Babur has a maximum speed of approximately 550 mph. On launch, a booster provides additional thrust to accelerate the missile away from the launch vehicle. After the launch the wings unfold, the booster rocket is jettisoned and the jet engine started. The missile is stated to have a high degree of maneuverability, allowing it to "hug" the terrain, and "near-stealth" capabilities. Terrain-hugging ability helps the missile avoid enemy radar detection by utilizing "terrain masking", giving Babur the capability to penetrate enemy air defence systems undetected.

The Babur's guidance system uses a combination of inertial navigation systems (INS), terrain contour matching (TERCOM) and GPS satellite guidance. The guidance system reportedly gives the missile pinpoint accuracy. GPS access is not guaranteed under hostile conditions so the latest production models have also reportedly incorporated the Russian GLONASS. Future software and hardware updates could include the European Union's GALILEO and China's BeiDou Navigation Satellite System.  An upgraded variant tested on the 14 December 2016 included upgraded avionics where now the missile is able to accurately hit land and sea based targets without the aid of GPS. Also the missile is able to hit targets more accurately.

Operational history
On 12 August 2005, Pakistan publicly announced that it had successfully test-fired a nuclear-capable cruise missile with a range of 500 km. The missile was launched from a land-based transporter erector launcher (TEL). Pakistan did not notify India of its test-firing as the existing notification agreement is limited to ballistic missile testing only.

On 22 March 2007, Pakistan test-fired an upgraded version of the Babur with an extended range of 700 km.

On 6 May 2009, Pakistan conducted another test-firing but did not announce the event until 9 May 2009, citing political reasons.

On 28 October 2011, Pakistan successfully test-fired its Babur cruise missile which has a range of 700 km. The ISPR said Babur was capable of carrying conventional and atomic warheads. A special feature of this launch was the validation of a new multi-tube missile launch vehicle (MLV) during the test. The three-tube MLV enhances manifold the targeting and deployment options in the conventional and nuclear modes. With its shoot-and-scoot capability, the MLV provides a major force multiplier effect for target employment and survivability.

On 6 June 2012, Pakistan conducted a successful test-fire of the multi-tube, indigenously developed cruise missile Hatf-VII (Babur), which can carry both nuclear and conventional warheads with stealth capabilities. It was the third test-fire conducted by Pakistan in the recent past, of different capacity and load. “It can carry both nuclear and conventional warheads and has stealth capabilities”, said an official announcement of the ISPR. “It also incorporates the most modern cruise missile technology of Terrain Contour Matching (Tercom) and Digital Scene Matching and Area Co-relation (DSMAC), which enhances its precision and effectiveness manifolds.” A new variant of the missile, termed Babur-1B, was test fired on 14 April 2018.

On 14 December 2016, Pakistan conducted a successful launch of an enhanced version of the Babur II missile. Enhancements include upgraded aerodynamics and avionics where now the missile is able to accurately hit targets without the aid of GPS, and also target sea-based targets as well land based targets.

On 9 January 2017, Pakistan conducted a successful launch of the Babur III missile from an underwater mobile platform. The Babur-III has a range of 450 km and can be used as a second-strike capability. It has been speculated that the missile is ultimately designed to be incorporated with the Agosta 90B-class submarine which has been reported to have been modified. On 29 March 2018, Pakistan reported that the missile had again been successfully tested.

On 11 February 2021, Pakistan conducted successful launch of Babur-1A cruise missile having upgraded avionics and navigation systems and capability to hit the ground based and sea based surface targets with the range of 450 km.

On 21 December 2021, Pakistan conducted a successful test of an enhanced range version of the indigenously developed Babur-1B that had a range of more than 900 km.

Variants
The Babur weapons system was developed over a series of variants by the Pakistan military.

 Babur-1: Initial variant developed with the range of 700 km first tested on 22 March 2007.
 Babur-2: The second variant of the Babur missile series, it boasts an enhanced range of 750  and was developed to hit ground and naval targets without using a GPS. The variant was first tested on 14 December 2016.
 Babur-3: Submarine launched variant with a range of 450 km. It was first tested on 9 January 2017 and provides second strike capabilities.
 Babur-1A: Enhanced avionics and navigation systems with a range of 450 km. It can hit ground and naval targets with high accuracy. It was first tested on 11 February 2021.
 Babur-1B: Enhanced range variant which can hit targets more than 900 km, the first test being conducted on 21 December 2021.

Harbah
Harbah is a ship launched anti-ship and land-attack non-nuclear cruise missile believed to have been derived from Babur. ISPR, media wing of the Pakistan Armed Forces, reported that the missile was test fired on 3 January 2018 from PNS Himmat, an  missile boat.

Harbah export variant
A variant of the Harbah Missile for export, this variant has a range of 290 km. According to NDS, The salient features of this missile are a mid-course/terminal guidance system, fire and forget capabilities and an all weather operational capability.

See also
Related developments
 Hatf-VIII (Ra'ad) 
Similar missiles
 Tomahawk (missile)
 CJ-10 (missile)
 Hyunmoo-3
 Nirbhay

Related lists
 List of missiles
 List of missiles by country

References

External links
 Jane's Information article on Hatf 7 (Babur)
 Jane's Information article on Hatf 7 (Babur)
 www.PakMilitary.net - Babur - Pakistan's Cruise Missile

Science and technology in Pakistan
Cruise missiles of Pakistan
Naval cruise missiles
Anti-ship missiles of Pakistan
Anti-ship cruise missiles of Pakistan
Military equipment introduced in the 2010s
Submarine-launched cruise missiles